Chinwendu Ihezuo (born 30 April 1997) is a Nigerian professional footballer who plays as a forward for Liga MX Femenil club Monterrey and the Nigeria women's national team.

Early life
Ihezuo was born on 30 April 1997 in Ajegunle, Lagos, Nigeria. Her childhood was lived in Lagos. Her parents were very supportive of her when she started playing football. Her mother supported her interest in the sport by buying her football jerseys in the local market. Throughout most of her youth, she competed and played with boys in Ajegunle. Ajegunle has produced some of Nigeria's best men's football players.

Club career

From 2012 to 2014, she played for the Pelican Stars of Calabar.  After that, she moved to the Delta Queens, and was with them until the end of the 2015 season.

BIIK Kazygurt

Ihezuo joined the professional club side BIIK Kazygurt of Kazakhstan for the 2016 on a one-year contract. In her debut season with the club where she wore number 19, she scored 16 goals for BIIK Kazygurt in 20 appearances.  She competed with the team at the 2016-17 UEFA Women's Champions League, starting two games, and playing 180 minutes.  Goalless in that period, she also picked up a yellow card in her team's 3–1 home victory against Verona.  She made her debut in Champions League in her team's 3–1 victory against Wexford Youths during tournament qualifying.

Henan Huishang F.C. 
On 7 April 2019 it was announced that she had joined Henan Huishang in the Chinese Women's Super League. On the very same day, she scored on her debut for her new side in a 4–1 defeat to Jiangsu Suning.

Ihezuo's career in China began brightly with six goals coming in just six matches of her side's 2019 CFA Tournament campaign as Henan Huishang finished 9th overall. She was then selected by coach Thomas Dennerby as a member of Nigeria's squad for the 2019 FIFA Women's World Cup.

Over the course of the 2019 Chinese Women's Super League, Ihezuo was the league's third top-scorer with seven goals from her 14 appearances. In spite of her efforts, Henan finished in seventh position out of eight teams.

Owing to the consequences of the COVID-19 pandemic, Ihezuo was unable to return to China to compete in the 2020 Chinese Women's Super League season despite being under contract for a second season. Both Ihezuo and colleague Ebi Onome missed the entire campaign due to the closure of air travel out of Nigeria.

International career

Senior national team
Following her performance at the 2014 FIFA U-20 World Cup, she was invited to attend a national team training camp for potential selection to the side that would compete at an African Women's Championship in Namibia.

In March 2016, she was one of 40 players called up to prepare for the 2016 Africa Women Cup of Nations.  She was a member of the senior national side for the 2015 All African Games in Congo.

In November 2018, she was selected for the 2018 Africa Women Cup of Nations and appeared as a substitute in the final as Nigeria overcame South Africa to claim the title.

Her first international goal came in January 2019, scoring in victory over Romania in a game played as part of the Meizhou International Women's Football Tournament in China.

U-20 national team
Ihezuo was first called up to the team in 2014. She represented Nigeria at the 2014 FIFA U-20 Women's World Cup where the team narrowly lost in the finals to Germany.  She was one of the leading goal scorers in the competition.  That year, she also played for the team in a friendly against Ghana.  She scored the game's only goal that saw Nigeria win 1–0.

In September 2016, she was invited to the 29 member strong national team training camp that was preparing for the 2018 FIFA U-20 Women's World Cup.  She joined the team late for the camp in October in Abuja, after the national team coach threatened her and other overseas players with being dropped if they did not arrive by 8 October. She had to miss a training session as she needed time to recover from jet lag.  As a player, she acknowledged the pressure she felt at camp going into the tournament to perform well.

She scored seven goals for Nigeria in the qualifying competition for the World Cup.  One of her goals came in the 16th minute in their return game against South Africa.  The goal qualified Nigeria for the FIFA World Cup.  Another goal came in Nigeria's 2–1 victory against Congo DR.

U-17 national team
Ihezuo made her international debut for Nigeria at the 2012 FIFA U-17 Women's World Cup in Azerbaijan.  She came away from the tournament with six goals.  Five of these goals came in one game against hosts Azerbaijan, which her team won 11–0.  The win was Nigeria's biggest in any FIFA World Cup appearance.  Her five goals were also a record for most goals scored in a single game at the FIFA U-17 Women's World Cup.  The record has previously been held by Germany's Kyra Malinowski and South Korea's Yeo Minji, who scored four goals each in the 2010 edition of the tournament.  Her fete was matched by Lorena Navarro at the 2016 edition when the Spaniard scored 5 goals against Jordan. Her six goals also earned her the Silver Boot for the tournament.  The award was presented to her at the 2012 Annual General Assembly of the Nigerian Football Federation.  Her team was eliminated from the tournament after losing to France in the quarter-finals.

Not named to the squad in 2013, Ihezuo was also a member of the team in 2014.  She again competed at the World Cup, wearing number 19 and playing in the team's game against China where she came on as a substitute.

Honours

International
 Nigeria
African Women's Championship (1): 2018
FIFA U-20 Women's World Cup Runner-up: 2014

Club
 BIIK Kazygurt
Kazakhstani Championship (3): 2016, 2017, 2018
Kazakhstani Women's Cup (3): 2016, 2017, 2018

Individual
FIFA U-17 Women's World Cup Silver Boot: 2012

Career statistics

Club

References

External links
 
 

1997 births
Living people
Women's association football forwards
Nigerian women's footballers
Sportspeople from Lagos
Nigeria women's international footballers
2019 FIFA Women's World Cup players
BIIK Kazygurt players
Nigerian expatriate women's footballers
Nigerian expatriate sportspeople in Kazakhstan
Expatriate women's footballers in Kazakhstan
Nigerian expatriate sportspeople in China
Expatriate women's footballers in China
Delta Queens F.C. players
21st-century Nigerian women